Captain Henry Singleton Pennell VC (18 June 1874 – 19 January 1907) was an English recipient of the Victoria Cross, the highest and most prestigious award for gallantry in the face of the enemy that can be awarded to British and Commonwealth forces.

Early life and background
He was born in 1874 in Dawlish, Devon to Edwin Francis Pennell and his wife Henrietta née Copeland and was educated Eastbourne College, Sussex where there is now a Pennell House.

Military career
Pennell attended the Royal Military College, Sandhurst, from 1892 to 1893, before joining the Derbyshire Regiment (later The Sherwood Foresters (Nottinghamshire and Derbyshire Regiment)) as a second lieutenant on 21 October 1893. He was prompted to lieutenant on 18 July 1896.

Pennell was 23 years old, and a lieutenant in the 2nd Battalion, The Derbyshire Regiment, British Army during the Tirah Campaign, British India when the following deed took place on 20 October 1897 for which he was awarded the VC.

He was also awarded the India Medal with 2 clasps.

During the Second Boer War he was part of the large force sent out to relieve the Siege of Ladysmith, and took part in the Battle of Spion Kop (January 1900) and the Battle of the Tugela Heights (February 1900), where he was wounded on the day before the actual relief of the city. He was awarded the Queen's South Africa Medal with 2 clasps and was twice mentioned in dispatches. He later achieved the rank of Staff Captain at Southern Command. He was promoted to captain on 30 May 1900.

He was accidentally killed on 19 January 1907 whilst toboganning on the Cresta Run at St Moritz, Switzerland. He is buried in Dawlish Parish Churchyard where there is a large MI to him and others of the family.

His Victoria Cross is displayed at the Sherwood Foresters Museum, Nottingham Castle. His sword made by Wilkinson Sword Museum on 13 July 1893 numbered 32227 is in possession of a Military Antiques Toronto in Ontario Canada.

References

Location of grave and VC medal (Devonshire)
 Details from VC.Org

1874 births
1907 deaths
Burials in Devon
People educated at Eastbourne College
People from Dawlish
Sherwood Foresters officers
British military personnel of the Tirah campaign
British Army personnel of the Second Boer War
British recipients of the Victoria Cross
Graduates of the Royal Military College, Sandhurst
Sport deaths in Switzerland
English male skeleton racers
British Army recipients of the Victoria Cross
Military personnel from Devon